Turnastone is a village and civil parish  west of Hereford, in the county of Herefordshire, England. In 2001 the parish had a population of 28. The parish touches St. Margarets and Vowchurch. Turnastone shares a parish council with Michaelchurch Escley, Newton, St Margarets and Vowchurch called "Vowchurch and District Group Parish Council".

Landmarks 
There are 12 listed buildings in Turnastone. Turnastone has a church called St Mary Magdalene.

History 
The name "Turnastone" means 'de Turnei's town' and it was probably earlier called "Wluetone" from Robert de Turuei, who held the manor after the Conquest.

References

External links 

 
 

Villages in Herefordshire
Civil parishes in Herefordshire